"Red Museum" is the tenth episode of the second season of the science fiction television series The X-Files. It premiered on the Fox network on December 9, 1994. It was written by Chris Carter, directed by Win Phelps, and featured guest appearances by Mark Rolston, Paul Sand, Bob Frazer, and Robert Clothier. The episode helps to explore the series' overarching mythology. "Red Museum" earned a Nielsen household rating of 10.4, being watched by 9.9 million households in its initial broadcast. The episode received mixed to positive reviews from critics.

The show centers on FBI special agents Fox Mulder (David Duchovny) and Dana Scully (Gillian Anderson) who work on cases linked to the paranormal, called X-Files. In the episode, Mulder and Scully travel to Wisconsin after several teens are found wandering in the woods in their underwear with “He Is One” or “She Is One” scrawled on their backs. However, the duo soon stumble upon a strange cult of vegetarian “walk-ins.”

Originally, the episode was slated to be a crossover episode with the CBS show Picket Fences. However, the networks nixed the idea before any filming could begin. A facet of the episode, that the adherents of the Red Museum believe that the year 2012 will bring about the dawning of The New Age, is later referenced in the series' finale "The Truth", seven seasons later.

Plot 

Fox Mulder and Dana Scully are called in to investigate a number of kidnappings in Delta Glen, Wisconsin where local teenagers are recovered half-naked and drugged with either the phrase "He is one" or "She is one" written on their backs. Meeting with Sheriff Mazeroski, the agents initially suspect a nearby cult, the Church of the Red Museum, which was founded by vegetarian Richard Odin. Mulder, Scully and Mazeroski attend a ceremony of the Red Museum, causing Mulder to believe that they are walk-ins, people whose souls have been taken over by someone else. One of the kidnap victims claims to have felt an animal spirit enter him.

Katie, the girlfriend of Mazeroski's son Rick, is the latest to be found, and her blood is found to contain an unknown alkaloid substance and high levels of scopolamine, a controlled substance. This appears to link her to Odin, a former doctor. Meanwhile, the agents meet an old man who points to a pair of men injecting growth serum into cattle, which he believes is the cause of the trouble. That night, local doctor Jerrold Larson is killed in a plane crash. An investigation of the site turns up shipping orders that trace back to the kidnapped teens. One of the men injecting the cows is murdered by the Crew Cut Man. The other, a peeping tom named Gerd Thomas, is revealed to be the kidnapper after the agents find a hidden supply of videotapes in the home of one of the victims. Thomas claims that Larson had been turning the children into "monsters" with the drugs he had been injecting in them, which he claims to be unknown.

Meanwhile, Rick is murdered by the Crew Cut Man. Having passed by him on the road, Scully recognizes him as the assassin who killed Deep Throat. Her toxicology results on the victims show what she thinks is the mysterious substance known as "Purity Control". Mulder theorizes that Larson had been injecting the children with alien DNA, and convinces Mazeroski to round up all of the children who had been receiving treatment from Larson and hide them in the Church of the Red Museum. Mulder tracks the Crew Cut Man down at a beef processing plant that he is about to destroy. While Mulder wants him alive, Mazeroski kills him as revenge for Rick's murder.

Scully reports that the Crew Cut Man had no records on file with the FBI or other agencies. The material injected into the cows and children is found to be an unknown substance. All the children who were inoculated came down with a flu-like illness. But those in the Church of the Red Museum, being vegetarians, did not, causing her to think they may be being used as a control group without their knowledge. Scully declares the case open and unsolved.

Production

The original draft of "Red Museum" functioned as a crossover episode with the CBS show Picket Fencesan idiosyncratic drama that ran from 1992 until 1996 and was set in the fictional Wisconsin town of Rome. This idea came about when David E. Kelley (the creator of Picket Fences) and Chris Carter (the creator of The X-Files) were talking in a parking lot about how interesting it would be to have Mulder and Scully visit Rome.

Kelley and Carter started to plan out ideas, agreeing that unlike traditional crossovers, the two shows would each air their own episode, featuring characters from the other series. However, CBS vetoed the crossover idea. Executive producer Robert Goodwin said of the experience: "I spent days on the phone with a producer of Picket Fences. We spent days organizing our schedules. Then at the very last minute, of course, we found out that no one had told CBS, and they said 'Forget it. We're having enough trouble on Friday nights without publicizing The X-Files.' It's too bad." The Picket Fences episode originally intended to crossover with The X-Files was called "Away in the Manger" and aired the week following "Red Museum." While every reference to Picket Fences was purged from The X-Files episode, the Picket Fences episode contains a few subtle references to the happenings in "Red Museum", including a mention of Dr. Larson.

Producer and writer Glen Morgan was disappointed with how the Crew Cut Man was killed off in the episode, saying, "My feeling is that to bring this guy back, his presence should have been better developed, and he's shot off screen. I thought 'Geez, this is the guy who killed Deep Throat, who the audience loved, and it's kind of tossed away.' The episode just seems like half of one thing for a while, then half of something else. I think that was a curious choice for Chris [Carter]. He wanted to take a real left turn, but I'd rather have seen a whole episode about that guy showing up and Mulder getting back at him." Morgan's writer partner James Wong disliked the episode, saying, "I think that was one of the most confusing episodes I've ever seen. It had some really neat ideas in it, but I don't think it pulled together finally."

Ladner, British Columbia served as a location for Delta Glen, while the beef processing plant was shot in a facility in Cloverdale; local employees at the latter were even used as extras in the butchering and cleaning up scenes. The episode is the first in the series to mention the concept of walk-ins, a plot device that would later be used five seasons later, when the truth about Samantha's abduction was finally revealed.

Broadcast and reception

"Red Museum" premiered on the Fox network on December 9, 1994. This episode earned a Nielsen rating of 10.4, with an 18 share, meaning that roughly 10.4 percent of all television-equipped households, and 18 percent of households watching television, were tuned in to the episode. It was viewed by 9.9 million households.

The episode received mostly mixed reviews from critics. Entertainment Weekly gave "Red Museum" a B, noting that the episode was "creative if convoluted." Reviewer Zack Handlen of The A.V. Club criticized the way "Red Museum" was written, writing that the episode, "tries the neat trick of combining what appears to be a [Monster-of-the-Week] ep with mythos; the results are intriguing, but not entirely successful." He concluded that the episode was "good" but ultimately "forgettable." Critical Myth's John Keegan gave the episode 5/10, criticizing the complexity of the plot. He wrote that "Fairly quickly, The X-Files gained a reputation for episodes that were so convoluted and confusing that few people could make sense of them. This episode stands as one of the shining examples of that trend, and it’s only appropriate that the episode was written by Chris Carter."

Footnotes

Bibliography

External links 

 "Red Museum" on TheXFiles.com
 

1994 American television episodes
2012 phenomenon
Picket Fences
Television episodes written by Chris Carter
The X-Files (season 2) episodes
Television episodes set in Wisconsin
Crossover television